Gurvanbulag is a Mongolian place name which may refer to

Gurvanbulag, Bayankhongor, a sum (district) of Bayankhongor Province
Gurvanbulag, Bulgan, a sum (district) of Bulgan Province